The 2014 Asian Shotgun Championships were held at Equestrian, Shooting & Golf Club, Al-Ain, United Arab Emirates between 1 and 10 November 2014.

Medal summary

Men

Women

Medal table

References 

 ISSF Results Overview
 Complete Results

External links 
 Asian Shooting Federation

Asian Shooting Championships
Asian
Shooting